The Ebirah people, also known or spelled as Igbirra or Egbira people, are an ethnic-linguistic a group of central Nigeria. Most Ebira people are from Kogi State, Nasarawa State. Their language is usually classified as a Nupoid variety within the Benue-Congo branch of the Niger-Congo language family. Until the separation of Kogi State from Kwara State, Okene was seen as the administrative center of the Ebira-speaking people in Kogi state , located not far from the Niger-Benue confluence. Since the formation of the state, the Ebira Ta'o people are found in four local governments namely: Adavi, Ajaokuta, Federal Capital Territory, and Nasarawa in Toto LGA. Also, the Eganyi are found in Ajaokuta LGA. And the Etuno can be found in Igarra town of Amagongo, Okehi and Okene each with their administrative headquarters. Ebira Koto is found in Kogi and Koton Karfe  LGA, Bassa LGA, Lokoja in Kogi and Abaji LGA in the Federal Capital Territory Akoko-Edo LGA, Edo state.

After decades of campaign, intellectual brainstorming and organized symposia/conferences, the people of Egbira from various enclaves have secured the official gazette of a common name spelt as “Egbira” for the ethnic group. 

Ibrahim Ohida, national secretary of Ohiku-Egbira Descendants Union (OEDU), in a statement, announced the development.

Egbira is an ethnic group indigenous to some parts of Kogi, Nasarawa, Edo, and the federal capital territory (FCT).

They have been variously called Ebira, Igbira, Ebirra, Egbirra, Ibira, Ibirra and Egbira in the past.

According to OEDU, the official gazette of the common name — Egbira — is contained in the Federal Republic of Nigeria Official Gazette No. 127, volume 109, dated July 14, 2022.

The group said the adoption of the common name was made based on the agreements reached during consultations with traditional fathers and stakeholders at Okene and Koton Karfe conventions in 2010 and 2021, respectively.

“The Ohiku-Egbira Descendants Union (OEDU), wishes to formally inform members of the Egbira Nation that the Union has secured an official gazette of the agreed common name EGBIRA spelt E-G-B-I-R-A for people of the Egbira Nation comprising Egbira Opete, Egbira Miyakan and Egbira Etuno (Igarra),” the statement reads.

“This is contained in the Federal Republic of Nigeria Official Gazette No. 127, Volume 109 dated 14th July, 2022.

“As you are aware, this adoption of the common name EGBIRA is done in line with our agreement following consultation with our Royal Fathers, stakeholders from the three zones and resolutions at the Okene and Koton Karfe Conventions in 2010 and 2021, respectively.

“This is in recognition of our common ancestry and expressed desire to be so recognised for reasons of unity, numerical strength and enhanced political relevance among the comity of ethnic nationalities in Nigeria.

“This milestone of officially gazetting our name as EGBIRA, has been twenty years coming. Congratulations to all of us. We need to now rededicate ourselves and all work together for the full application of this name in all our official dealings.”

Geography
In recent history, Ebira people inhabit a territory south-west of the confluence of the Niger and Benue Rivers though some Ebira communioties also reside on the north-east of the confluence, the territory surrounding the confluence is an ethnically diverse area with diffused cultural symbols. Ebiraland is north of Etsako, east of Kabba and west of Igalaland, it is dominated by deciduous woodland and rocky hills of an open Savannah vegetation.

The major local government areas are Adavi, Ajaokuta, Koton-Karfi, Okehi and Okene. Since the advent of colonialism, many Ebiras have moved southwards due to search for arable farming spaces and working as migrant farmers.

History

Early population movements
The migration of Ebira people to the present region is mostly surmised by oral history. However, most versions trace the migration from the Jukuns of the Kwararafa state, north of the Benue River and in present-day Taraba State. One of the relics of their trace from Kwararafa is the Apete stool, their symbol of authority and identity as a group within the kingdom, brought along and kept in a place in Opete (deriving its name from the stool), in present-day Ajaokuta. The Apete is presently the title instrument of Ozumi of Okene. After migration from Kwararafa, they originally settled with the Igalas and both groups lived together for about 300 years. A dispute between the two groups led to a parting of ways, and the Ebiras moved southwest of the River Niger to their ancestral home called Ebira Opete an area around Ajaokuta. Other groups later moved south to found Okengwe, Uboro, and Okehi. Historically, these Ebiras communities were autonomous units without a central king or recognized royal families but were managed by leaders of lineages in a type of gerontocracy. The Ebiras left Idah After Idah-Benin War Around 1519-1521, They had a stop by at Itobe. The Remaining  Ebira Group That left Idah is ITAAZI (Ebira tao) IGU (Ebira koto),  PANDA (Ebira Toto, Nasarawa,) AGATU (Ebira Benue the Father of  Ebira MOZUM that chose to Settled  Among Basa and Finally UNO ( Ebira Ètè-Uno, Edo) who chose to settle across the River Benue with ITAAZI. UNO settled in the Present day Edo State. All  Members of the various clans in Ebira Tao are descendants of the children of ITAAZI.  ITAAZI had five (5) sons named (Adaviruku/Ohizi, Ododo, Obaji, Uga, Ochuga/Onotu). Ohizi (Adaviruku) had five children who are progenitors of the five traditional Adavi clans named after them. They  occupied the present-day Ajaokuta,  Adavi, Okene, Okengwe, Okehi, Eika, Ihiara, and Osisi  Amongst Others.

Pre-colonial and colonial period
During the conquest of Hausaland by the armies of the religious and political leader Uthman Dan Fodio, the Ebiras came under a state of conflict with Fulani warlords to the north and west. In the middle of the nineteenth century, two major communities, Igu (Koton Large) as it was called by Hausa, it means strong land because they fought to conquer them but never succeeded and were not conquered. Between 1865 and 1880, they battled, under the leadership of a warlord, Achigidi Okino, with jihadists called Ajinomoh who were from Bida and Ilorin. However, the Ebiras were not conquered by the Fulanis, helped in part by the natural defenses of their hilly environment.

British interest in Ebiraland started with the location of a Royal Niger Company post in Lokoja. In 1898, the British annexed Ilorin and Nupeland under the pretext of controlling the free flow of trade, they set up a military post in Kabba west of Ebiraland and the Ebiras soon were a target for annexation. In 1903, after much resistance, Ebira territory fell under British control. To manage the various autonomous villages, a central figure was appointed by the British to represent Ebiras. The first of such figures was Ouda Adidi of Eika, who ruled until 1903, he was succeeded by Omadivi, a favorite of the British. Omadivi was a clan head who had earlier fought against Jihadists but supported trade with the British. During his reign, his authority over the other clans was minimal. When Omadivi died, Adano was appointed but had a short reign. In 1917, a new ruler, Ibrahim was chosen, Ibrahim was also called Attah Ibrahim or Attah of Ebiraland, he was a maternal grandson of Omadivi. It was during his reign that the British colonists introduced indirect rule, a significant political development that increased the authority of Attah. Ibrahim used his position as head of the Ebira Native Authority to bring together the autonomous communities under his political leadership, a process that was opposed by some members of those communities. He gained the confidence of the British who entrusted territories northwards of Ebiraland such as Lokoja to him. Ibrahim was a Muslim convert and helped spread Islam in the region. However, Ibrahim was exiled in 1954, a consequence of political intrigues. The first primary school in the community was located in his palace and many of his children were educated and some ended up holding prominent positions in the regional and federal governments. Ibrahim was succeeded by Sani Omolori who held the title of Ohinoyi of Ebiraland.

Religion
Before the advent of Christianity and Islam, Ebira people practiced a form of African traditional religion with a central focus on a god called Ohomorihi, the rain-maker who lives in the sky. Rites are performed to appease the god whose attributes include punishing evildoers and rewarding good people. Other religious figures below the Ohomorihi are ori (deities) and spirits. In Ebira tradition, there is a belief in a spirit world where dead ancestors live.

Culture

Family life, food and social system
In the early history of the Ebira people, the family was headed by the father or the oldest male who acted as the provider, religious leader, and protector of the nuclear family (Ireh). Other important social systems are compounds (Ohuoje) which are composed of related or kindred patrilineal families, Ovovu, the outer compounds, and then lineages (Abara), composed of several related compounds. The Clan (Iresu) which is a community of kindred lineages in Ebiraland is led by the Otaru. Clan identities are distinguished by symbols mostly animals such as leopards, crocodiles, pythons, or buffalo. The affairs of the community were managed by a group of elder male members each representing related lineages.

The principal occupation of Ebiras is farming, they cultivate maize, yams, cassava, and vegetables. In the nineteenth century some communities cultivated and traded beni seeds as "gorigo".

Ebiras are also known for the weaving of clothing, and crafts and are very industrious.

The Ebira people also have peculiar ways that they prepare their meals which are only distinct to them and form their identity; The Ebira people bring to the world, Ọve. This food is typically what we know as moi moi but for the colorful group, they make this moi moi out of water yam (Evina) rather than the typical beans that many Nigerians are used to.

Contemporary Ebira social life has seen changes over the years, though farming is still a dominant occupation, many Ebiras are influenced by Western and contemporary Nigerian culture and live in urban settlements. Behaviors such as polygamy and a close relationship with a related lineage are fading and the Attah or Ohinoyi is no longer the dominant political authority within the land. Another new tradition embraced by the Ohinoyi was handing out chieftaincy titles to individuals named to be " Taru or Ohi" as is common in many other Nigerian cultures.

Ebira territory such as Ajaokuta is cosmopolitan as a result of the construction of a steel mill in the town.

Ekuechi festival
Ekuechi festival is the most widely celebrated traditional festival in Ebira communities, it is held annually starting in late November and ending in late December or January. The duration of the festival is long because different clans choose their dates to mark the festival. "Eku" in Ebira represents an ancestral masquerade while "Chi" means to descend. In traditional Ebira culture there exists a belief in the existence of a land of the living and another for the dead, and veneration of the land of the dead by those from the land of the living. Ekuechi thus can be interpreted as ancestral spirits returning to earth. The masquerades performing in the festival are believed to have access to the spirit world where dead relatives abide noting the behaviors of the living. During the festival, these masquerades deliver messages of good tidings and admonishment from the spirit world. The festival also marks the end of the year and the beginning of a new one. A major performance during the festival is a masked performance by Eku'rahu that is centered on singing, drumming, and chanting.

Notable people of Ebira Origin 

 Ohinoyi of Ebiraland
 Mercy Johnson
 Joseph Makoju formerly Managing Director [Lafarge WAPCo; NEPA and Dangote Cement]
Natasha Akpoti 
Yahaya Bello

References

External links
 EbiraOnline.com Media Page On Ebira Histories
Ethnologue report on Ebira language

Sources

Ethnic groups in Nigeria